Armando Perna (born 25 April 1981) is an Italian football coach and former central defender who is currently working for Legnago as an assistant coach.

Career
He started his career at Serie C1 team Palermo. He was loaned to Serie A Udinese youth team in 2000. In 2001, he was loaned to Livorno, another Serie C1 team, playing 10 games. After Livorno won promotion, the team signed him permanently. He found it difficult to win a regular place, just playing 12 games in his first Serie B season.

He was loaned out again, this time to Salernitana and Modena, both Serie B. Modena F.C. signed him in a co-ownership deal in 2005, and gained full ownership in 2006.

He was loaned to Parma in January 2007, until the end of the season.

On 7 September 2020 he moved to Legnago. After one season as a team captain, in June 2021 Perna announced his retirement, whilst remaining at Legnago as an assistant coach.

References

External links
 aic.football.it 
 
 

1981 births
Footballers from Palermo
Living people
Italian footballers
Association football central defenders
Palermo F.C. players
Udinese Calcio players
U.S. Livorno 1915 players
U.S. Salernitana 1919 players
Modena F.C. players
Parma Calcio 1913 players
Calcio Padova players
S.S.D. Correggese Calcio 1948 players
Paganese Calcio 1926 players
F.C. Legnago Salus players
Serie A players
Serie B players
Serie C players
Serie D players
S.S. Maceratese 1922 players